Bixente Jean-Michel Lizarazu (born 9 December 1969) is a French former professional footballer who played as a left back for Bordeaux and Bayern Munich, among other teams. He also had 97 caps for the France national team.

In a twelve-year international career from 1992 to 2004, Lizarazu played in three European championships and two World Cups for France, winning the 1998 FIFA World Cup and UEFA Euro 2000.

Early life
Lizarazu was born in Saint-Jean-de-Luz, Pyrénées-Atlantiques.

Club career

Bordeaux
An enthusiast in several sports from a young age, Lizarazu began his professional career with Bordeaux, joining the club's youth setup as a 15-year-old in 1984 and initially playing as a winger. After being told he would not make a career from football due to his frail physicality as a teenager, he impressed the staff with his determination and became a member of the senior squad in 1988 alongside forward Christophe Dugarry. He was retrained to play as a counter-attacking left back at the suggestion of coach Didier Couécou and soon replaced the veteran Gernot Rohr (later to be the club's manager) in the position.

In 1990 Bordeaux finished runners-up in the French championship, but the following year they were administratively relegated amid financial problems. Lizarazu remained with the club and helped them immediately regain their top tier status in 1992. The club also signed Zinedine Zidane, who became another important element of the team, which went on to achieve two 4th- and a 7th-place finish over the next three seasons, Lizarazu contributing 101 appearances and 15 goals.

In summer 1995, Bordeaux won the UEFA Intertoto Cup to qualify for the 1995–96 UEFA Cup. They would go all the way to the final under coach Rohr, beating Real Betis, A.C. Milan and Slavia Prague before losing to Bayern Munich 5–1 on aggregate. However their league form suffered, dropping to 16th. Following UEFA Euro 1996, in which Dugarry, Zidane and Lizarazu were part of the French squad which reached the semi-finals, the three moved abroad seeking a new challenge: Zidane joining Juventus, Dugarry going to Milan and Lizarazu staying local but changing nations by moving to Athletic Bilbao, based the same distance from his home in the French Basque Country as Bordeaux. He appeared 299 times for his formative club, scoring 28 goals.

Athletic Bilbao
Lizarazu spent just one season with the La Liga club after becoming the first Frenchman to play for Athletic, which has a policy of selecting only players of Basque birth or heritage.

Suffering from a persistent groin injury, he was unable to displace the experienced Aitor Larrazábal at left back, received two red cards among the 16 league appearances he did make, and had disagreements with the head coach, compatriot Luis Fernández. In the 1997 close season, he transferred to Bayern Munich.

Bayern Munich
Before even playing a Bundesliga match, Lizarazu lifted a trophy with his new club, winning the inaugural edition of the preseason DFL-Ligapokal. It was the start of a highly successful spell in Bavaria, despite the interruption of some serious injuries, as he went on to win six Bundesliga championships (including three in a row between 1999 and 2001), as well as five DFB-Pokals, the Champions League in 2001 (scoring his penalty in the shootout), and the Intercontinental Cup. On winning the Intercontinental Cup in 2001, he became the first player to be a current European and World champion in both club and international football.

Lizarazu said that he would leave Bayern in the summer of 2004 and eventually signed with Olympique Marseille. However, after only six months back in France, he returned to Bayern Munich in January 2005. During his second spell with Bayern, ending in 2006 when he gave way to the emerging Philipp Lahm, Lizarazu wore the shirt number 69; clarifying that it was not a lewd gesture, he said this was because he was born in 1969, his height is 1.69 m and he weighed 69 kg. He made 268 appearances in all competitions for Bayern between 1997 and 2006, scoring eight goals. 183 of these games were in the German top-flight.

International career
Lizarazu was capped 97 times for France (for the first time on 14 November 1992 against Finland), scoring two goals, and helped them win the 1998 FIFA World Cup and Euro 2000, starting in the final of both tournaments. He retired from international football after France were surprisingly eliminated by eventual winners Greece at Euro 2004.

Style of play
Regarded by pundits as one of the best left-backs of his generation, Lizarazu was an attacking full-back or wing-back, who was known for his passing, technique, pace, stamina, and his ability to get up the flank and provide accurate crosses from the touch-line. In addition to his offensive prowess, he was also known for his defensive abilities, despite his diminutive stature, which, along with his speed, allowed him to track back.

Personal life
After retirement, Lizarazu got involved in Brazilian jiu-jitsu. He competed in a jiu-jitsu competition in Europe in 2009, where he became European champion in the Blue Belt Senior 1 Light Division. He is also a keen surfer and works as a football pundit for French television and radio. In 2013, Lizarazu was described as a "tramp" by his successor as France's left back, Patrice Evra, after he and other pundits criticised Evra for giving an impromptu team talk during half-time of a 2014 FIFA World Cup qualifying match against Belarus.

Lizarazu was formerly engaged to singer Elsa Lunghini from 1999 to 2006.

Lizarazu is a native speaker of Basque and French. In addition, he also speaks Spanish, German, and English.

Career statistics

Club

International

Scores and results list France's goal tally first, score column indicates score after each Lizarazu goal.

Honours
Bordeaux
Division 2: 1991–92
UEFA Intertoto Cup: 1995
UEFA Cup runner-up: 1995–96

Bayern Munich
Bundesliga: 1998–99, 1999–2000, 2000–01, 2002–03, 2004–05, 2005–06
DFB-Pokal: 1997–98, 1999–2000, 2002–03, 2004–05, 2005–06
DFB-Ligapokal: 1997, 1998, 1999, 2000
UEFA Champions League: 2000–01; runner-up: 1998–99
Intercontinental Cup: 2001

France
FIFA World Cup: 1998
UEFA European Championship: 2000
FIFA Confederations Cup: 2001, 2003

Individual
ESM Team of the Year: 1998–99
UEFA Team of the Year: 2001
FIFA XI: 2002
Équipe type spéciale 20 ans des trophées UNFP: 2011

Orders
Knight of the Legion of Honour: 1998

References

External links

 
 
 
 
 
 
 

1969 births
Living people
People from Saint-Jean-de-Luz
French-Basque people
French footballers
France international footballers
French expatriate sportspeople in Spain
Lizaru, Bixente
Olympique de Marseille players
FC Bayern Munich footballers
Athletic Bilbao footballers
FC Girondins de Bordeaux players
Bundesliga players
Expatriate footballers in Germany
La Liga players
Expatriate footballers in Spain
UEFA Euro 1996 players
1998 FIFA World Cup players
UEFA Euro 2000 players
2001 FIFA Confederations Cup players
2002 FIFA World Cup players
2003 FIFA Confederations Cup players
UEFA Euro 2004 players
FIFA World Cup-winning players
FIFA Confederations Cup-winning players
UEFA European Championship-winning players
Footballers from the Basque Country (autonomous community)
Chevaliers of the Légion d'honneur
French practitioners of Brazilian jiu-jitsu
Association football defenders
UEFA Champions League winning players
Sportspeople from Pyrénées-Atlantiques
French expatriate sportspeople in Germany
Basque Country international footballers
Footballers from Nouvelle-Aquitaine